Betania   is a town in Ayotlán Municipality, in Jalisco in central-western Mexico. The census of 2005 the town had a population of 2,849 inhabitants.

Place Names 
The city is named after the Palestinian city of Bethany now known as al-Eizariya, with the name originating from the Aramaic and Hebrew word Beth anya (בית עניא), meaning "house of the figs"; the literal translation of the Spanish name Betania.

References

Populated places in Jalisco